Tetraceratops insignis ("four-horned face emblem") is an extinct synapsid from the Early Permian that was formerly considered the earliest known representative of Therapsida, a group that includes mammals and their close extinct relatives. It is known from a single  skull, discovered in Texas in 1908. According to a 2020 study, it should be classified as a primitive non-therapsid sphenacodont rather than a genuine basal therapsid.

Description
 
Tetraceratops is known from a single  skull discovered in Texas in the early 1900s. Contrary to its genus name, Tetraceratops actually has six horns, one pair being on the premaxilla bones, one pair on the prefrontal bones, and one pair on the angular processes of the mandible.  When it was discovered and described in 1908, the skull was still embedded in a matrix, and only the premaxilla and prefrontal pairs were visible.  In life, thus, it would have resembled a large lizard with four horns on its snout, and a pair of large spines emanating from the corners of its jaw.

In addition to horns, Tetraceratops also had an impressive set of teeth. The second pair of teeth on the maxillary bones were large and fang-like. Likewise the first teeth in the upper jaw were long and dagger-like.

Classification

Tetraceratops was originally identified as a member of a group called Pelycosauria, an evolutionary grade of synapsids more basal than therapsids. It has been variously grouped in the family Sphenacodontidae, which is closely related to Therapsida, and Eothyrididae, which is more distantly related. Recent phylogenetic studies classify it as either a pelycosaur-grade synapsid or the basalmost therapsid, rendering its exact phylogenetic placement unclear. However, a new study by Spindler (in press) concluded that no convincing morphological evidence could be made for a therapsid placement of Tetraceratops and that this genus was better placed as a basal sphenacodontian.

See also

 List of synapsids
 Evolution of mammals

References

External links
Palaeos.com's article on therapsids
kheper.net 

Prehistoric sphenacodonts
Prehistoric synapsid genera
Cisuralian synapsids of North America
Transitional fossils
Fossil taxa described in 1908
Taxa named by William Diller Matthew
Kungurian genus first appearances
Kungurian genus extinctions